Seabraellus is a genus of beetles in the family Cerambycidae, containing the following species:

 Seabraellus gracilis Huedepohl, 1985
 Seabraellus splendidior Huedepohl, 1985

References

Trachyderini
Cerambycidae genera